Harpalus giacomazzoi is a species of ground beetle in the subfamily Harpalinae. It was described by Kataev & Wrase in 1996 and is endemic to Sichuan, China.

Description
Both antenna and palpi are brownish-yellow in colour with black head and dark brown or black tibiae.

References

giacomazzoi
Beetles described in 1996
Endemic fauna of Sichuan
Beetles of Asia